O2 Czech Republic (operating under the O2 brand) is a major integrated operator in the Czech Republic. It is now operating more than six million lines, both fixed and mobile, making it one of the Czech Republic’s leading providers of fully converged services. O2 Czech Republic operates a fixed and mobile network including a 3rd generation network, CDMA (for data), UMTS and EDGE, enabling voice, data and video transmission. O2 Czech Republic is also a provider of ICT services.

Previously two companies, fixed-line operator Český Telecom and mobile operator Eurotel, it was acquired by the Spanish company Telefónica in 2005 and merged into a single legal entity and given its present name on 1 July 2006.

In 2013 it was announced that Telefónica would sell its stake in the company to PPF and the company would continue to use the O2 brand for a maximum of four years.  In August 2017 the brand license agreement was extended to 2022, with a 5 year extension to 2027 available.

History
The company was initially known as SPT Telecom  (Státní telekomunikační podnik, state-owned telecommunications company), and used to have a monopoly for providing fixed-line services. It was reorganized and renamed Český Telecom (Czech Telecom), after the Velvet Divorce saw Czechoslovakia separate into the Czech Republic and Slovakia in 1993.

Its mobile subsidiary, Eurotel, was founded in 1990 as a joint venture between SPT (51%) and the American joint-venture Atlantic West (between US WEST International, Inc. and Bell Atlantic International Inc.). On launch, it received an exclusive five-year licence to operate a public data network, and a 20-year licence for the 450 MHz band to operate an analogue NMT mobile phone network, and automatically also a right to buy a licence to the future GSM network.

In 2001, it won a license to the third-generation UMTS network. It paid 1 billion korunas immediately and promised to pay an additional 2.5 billion korunas annually. It also agreed to launch the service commercially, at least in Prague, by 1 January 2005. In 2003, it received a one-year extension in exchange for faster payments. In 2005 it was granted another year-long extension due to the granting of a third licence to Vodafone. In the event, UMTS services launched on 1 November 2005. On 1 May 2006, the company launched HSDPA services on top of UMTS services.

In 2004 it launched CDMA/1xEV-DO broadband wireless service (data-only) at 450 MHz, leveraging its legacy NMT network.

In 2012, O2 Czech Republic opened its network to virtual operators.

On 1 June 2015, O2 Czech Republic has been separated into two mutually independent companies. O2 is the retail operator with the infrastructure provided by CETIN. The separation includes commercial and managerial leadership and management of both companies, including security, IT and control systems.

References

External links
 

Mobile phone companies of the Czech Republic
Telecommunications companies established in 2006
2006 establishments in the Czech Republic
Telefónica
PPF Group